Lacera azatothi is a moth of the family Erebidae. It is found in New Guinea.

Taxonomy
Although named, the species has not been officially described.

References

Lacera
Moths of Papua New Guinea